Ronald M. Shapiro (born March 29, 1943) is an American attorney, sports agent, author, negotiator, educator, speaker, and civic leader.

Biography
Shapiro was born on March 29, 1943, in Philadelphia, Pennsylvania, to Mark and Lillian Shapiro. He grew up in neighboring Cheltenham Township and graduated from Cheltenham High School in 1960. Shapiro then attended Haverford College and graduated cum laude from Harvard Law School in 1967. From 1972 to 1974, Shapiro served as Maryland State Securities Commissioner. In 1972, he founded a Baltimore law firm now known as Shapiro Sher. Subsequently, in 1976, Shapiro founded Shapiro, Robinson & Associates, a sports management firm. In 1995, he founded Shapiro Negotiations Institute, a negotiation seminar and consulting firm. And, in 2017, he created Shapiro Advisors, LLC, a negotiation deal coaching and consulting company. In addition, he is the founder and creator of the Butler Conference of Leaders, which, since 2009, has brought together business and non-profit leaders to address economic, political, and social issues.

USA Today called Shapiro "one of baseball's most respected agent-attorneys," and The Sporting News named him one of the "100 most powerful people in sports." His list of clients includes more Hall of Famers than any other agent, such as Cal Ripken Jr., Jim Palmer, Brooks Robinson, Kirby Puckett, and Eddie Murray. Shapiro's current clients include Minnesota Twins catcher and 2009 AL MVP Joe Mauer. In addition, he serves as a Special Advisor to the owner of the Baltimore Ravens and to the General Managers of the San Antonio Spurs, Brooklyn Nets, and the Oklahoma City Thunder.

In October 1998, Shapiro's book, The Power of Nice: How To Negotiate So Everyone Wins- Especially You! was published. The book was excerpted in Fortune Magazine and named one of the "Top 'On the Job' Business Books of the Year" by the Library Journal. Shapiro's second book, Bullies, Tyrants & Impossible People: How To Beat Them Without Joining Them, published in 2005, made The Wall Street Journal's best seller list in its first week of publication. Shapiro's third book, Dare To Prepare: How To Win Before You Begin, published by Crown in January 2008, made the New York Times, Business Week and the Wall Street Journal's best sellers lists, was named the winner in two categories in the National Best Books 2008 Awards by USA Book News, and named Gold medal winner of the Success & Motivation category of the 2009 Axiom Business Book Awards.  Shapiro's fourth book, Perfecting Your Pitch: How To Succeed In Business And In Life By Finding Words That Work, was released in November 2013.

Family
Shapiro is married to Kathryn Adams Shapiro, a spiritual healer and writer. His family has been described as the "First Family of Sports Management." His seven children include: Mark Shapiro, the President of the Toronto Blue Jays; Julie Mangini, who is married to Eric Mangini, former Head Coach of the New York Jets and Cleveland Browns, and former  ESPN analyst and Defensive Coordinator for the San Francisco 49ers; William Beatson, a sports management consultant; Laura Dulac, the founder of the charity, Our Children Making Change; David Shapiro, CEO of MENTOR: The National Mentoring Partnership, the umbrella organization working to expand quality mentoring for young people in America; Philip Beatson, COO of Shady Grove Fertility; and John Beatson, a Principal at Marshfield Associates.

Shapiro Advisors, LLC 
In 2017, Shapiro created Shapiro Advisors, LLC, a negotiation deal coaching and consulting company. Included amongst its clients are the San Antonio Spurs, the Brooklyn Nets, the Oklahoma City Thunder, and the Cleveland Browns.

Shapiro Negotiations Institute

Shapiro co-founded the Shapiro Negotiations Institute (SNI) in 1995, which has trained over 350,000 professionals and worked with public and private organizations throughout the world such as: ADP, Bank of America, Best Buy, Black and Decker, Citigroup, ConvaTec, Ecolab, ESPN, Feld Entertainment, GE, Gen Re (a Berkshire Hathaway Company), Hearst Broadcasting, The Cleveland Indians, Johnson & Johnson, M&T Bank, Novo Nordisk, PricewaterhouseCoopers, Ryland Homes, Sunovion, Sherwin-Williams, Sony Pictures Entertainment, Stop & Shop, UPS, USDA, and Verizon.

Shapiro Sher 
Shapiro founded Shapiro Sher in 1972. The firm has offices in Baltimore and Washington, DC, and provides services in numerous practice areas, including bankruptcy, business law, and litigation. Since 1972, the Firm has provided representation to Fortune 100 corporations, emerging growth businesses, governments, non-profits, and individuals. Over half of the Firm's attorneys have been granted Martindale-Hubbell's AV Preeminent 5.0 rating, the highest rating given. In 2012, Shapiro Sher celebrated its 40th anniversary and in 2011 was cited as the top mid-size law firm in Maryland for business and transactions by Super Lawyers Business Edition 2011.

Career achievements
Shapiro's dispute resolution techniques have settled a symphony orchestra strike, facilitated solutions to human relations problems, and resolved disputes in governmental, corporate, and major biotechnology challenges. Shapiro has negotiated on behalf of, or served as deal coach to, Fortune 500 companies, government agencies, as well as entertainment and news personalities. Shapiro is known as a "WIN-win" negotiator.  He has been named "one of Maryland's Super Lawyers," has been featured in The Best Lawyers in America for 18 consecutive years, is a recipient of "The Daily Record's 2010 Leadership in Law Award." and was named "Sports Law Lawyer of the Year" in the 2012 edition of Baltimore's Best Lawyers. Shapiro received the American Law & Jurisprudence Award in recognition of his years in the practice of law awarded by Chabad at Johns Hopkins.

Academic and media involvement
Shapiro authored more than 20 law journal articles; co-authored books on corporate and securities law; founded Maryland's major bar review course; and began a legal publishing company. He taught at the Johns Hopkins University, the University of Maryland School of Law, the University of Baltimore School of Law, and spoke in the Harvard Law School Traphagen Distinguished Alumni Speaker Series where he was honored for his "multifaceted and fascinating career." Shapiro was named the 1996 Edward B. Shils Lecturer in Arbitration and Alternative Dispute Resolution at the University of Pennsylvania Law School. Shapiro appeared as a negotiations expert on ABC's Good Morning America, CNBC's Power Lunch, Mutual Radio's The Larry King Show, National Public Radio's Morning Edition and Talk of the Nation, ABC's Nightline, and ESPN's Mike and Mike in the Morning and Up Close. Shapiro hosted a weekly television talk show, Front Page, and Special Edition, a series of prime time specials, both on NBC Baltimore affiliates.  In addition, he appeared as a panelist on Square Off on CBS's Baltimore affiliate.

Community and civic involvement
Shapiro has chaired over 25 boards of charitable and community organizations, including Peace Players International, the Johns Hopkins Children's Center, and the University of Maryland Greenebaum Cancer Center Advisory Board, as well as serving on several others. He was also Treasurer and Finance Chairman for former Baltimore Mayor Kurt Schmoke. 
Shapiro has received special honors and recognition, including American Sportscasters Association Hall of Fame Mel Allen Service Award. The Ronald M. Shapiro Research Award and Lecture was established in recognition of Shapiro's service at the Greenebaum Cancer Center of the University of Maryland. In June 2003, Stevenson University awarded Shapiro the Honorary Doctor of Humane Letters degree. In 2013, Mr. Shapiro received the American Red Cross of the Chesapeake Region's Lifetime Achievement Award, was inducted into the Baltimore Jewish Hall of Fame, and was named as a member of "The Champions: Pioneers and Innovators in Sports Business" by SportsBusiness Journal and SportsBusiness Daily.
In 2018, Shapiro was inducted into the Baltimore Sun's Maryland Business and Civic Hall of Fame.

References

Further reading
 This chapter in Ruttman's history, based on an April 23, 2009 interview with Ron Shapiro and a February 29, 2008 interview with his son Mark Shapiro, discusses the Shapiros' American, Jewish, baseball, and life experiences from youth to the present.

External links
Shapiro Sher Guinot & Sandler

1943 births
Harvard Law School alumni
Haverford College alumni
Jewish American sportspeople
Johns Hopkins University faculty
Living people
Maryland lawyers
Negotiation scholars
Writers from Maryland
Lawyers from Philadelphia
American sports agents
University of Maryland, Baltimore faculty
People from Cheltenham, Pennsylvania
University of Pennsylvania Law School faculty
21st-century American Jews